In the geologic timescale, the Artinskian is an age or stage of the Permian. It is a subdivision of the Cisuralian Epoch or Series. It was preceded by the Sakmarian and followed by the Kungurian.

Stratigraphy 

The Artinskian is named after the small Russian city of Arti (formerly Artinsk), situated in the southern Ural mountains, about 200 km southwest of Yekaterinburg. The stage was introduced into scientific literature by Alexander Karpinsky in 1874.

Base of the Artinskian 
The base of the Artinskian Stage is defined as the first appearance datum (FAD) of the conodont species Sweetognathus whitei and Mesogondolella bisselli. In order to constrain this age, the ICS subcommission on Permian stratigraphy informally proposed a candidate GSSP in 2002, later followed by a formal proposal in 2013. The proposed GSSP location - the Dal'ny Tulkas roadcut in the Southern Urals, near the town of Krasnousolsky - was eventually ratified in February 2022.

U-Pb radiometric dating found that the base of the Artinskian was approximately 290.1 million years old (Ma), based on the position of the rock layer at the Dal'ny Tulkas roadcut containing the FAD of S. whitei relative to three precisely dated ash beds surrounding it. Earlier radiometric reported a much younger age of 280.3 Ma for the Sakmarian-Artinskian boundary.

Top of the Artinskian 
The top of the Artinskian (and the base of the Kungurian) is defined as the place in the stratigraphic record where fossils of conodonts Neostreptognathodus pnevi and Neostreptognathodus exculptus first appear.

Artinskian Warming Event
Around 287 million years ago occurred an interval of pronounced warming known as the Artinskian Warming Event (AWE). This period of global warming accelerated the deglaciation that had been occurring since the Sakmarian following the end of the most intense glacial phase of the Late Palaeozoic Ice Age. In addition, it is also associated with significant global drying, which had gradually been occurring since the Carboniferous-Permian boundary. Major aridification during the AWE is evidenced by a positive δ18O excursion observed in brachiopod fossils, with arid and semi-arid conditions expanding across much of Pangaea as glaciers receded to refugia in the polar regions of Gondwana.

References

External links 
 GeoWhen Database - Artinskian
 Upper Paleozoic stratigraphic chart at the website of the subcommission for stratigraphic information of the ICS

 
Permian geochronology
.